Mount Steinfeld is a mountain (685 m) at the west end of an ice-covered ridge that overlooks the confluence of Hull Glacier and Kirkpatrick Glacier, near the coast of Marie Byrd Land in West Antarctica. Smoot Rock lies 7 nautical miles (13 km) east-southeast of the mountain.

It was mapped by United States Geological Survey (USGS) from surveys and U.S. Navy air photos, 1959–65, and named by Advisory Committee on Antarctic Names (US-ACAN) for Edward F. Steinfeld, Jr., United States Antarctic Research Program (USARP) meteorologist at Byrd Station, 1962.

Mountains of Marie Byrd Land